Agyneta mongolica is a species of sheet weaver found in Mongolia and Russia. It was described by Loksa in 1965.

References

mongolica
Arthropods of Mongolia
Arthropods of Russia
Spiders of Russia
Spiders of Asia
Spiders described in 1965